The 1895–96 Bucknell Bison men's basketball team represented Bucknell University during the 1895–96 college men's basketball season. The team had finished with an overall record of 1–3.

Schedule

|-

References

Bucknell Bison men's basketball seasons
Bucknell
Bucknell
Bucknell